Chinese imperial guard may refer to various units and organisations in Chinese history these include

Imperial Guards (Tang dynasty), the imperial guards of the Tang dynasty
Jinyiwei, the imperial guards of the Ming dynasty
Imperial Guards (Qing China), the imperial guards of the Qing dynasty

See also
Kheshig, the imperial guards of the Mongols
Manchukuo Imperial Guards, the imperial guards of Manchukuo
61889 Regiment, the People's Liberation Army united tasked with protecting the top leadership of the People's Republic of China